"Wanksta" is a song by American rapper 50 Cent, released on November 5, 2002, as the second single from the soundtrack to the film 8 Mile (2002). The single, produced by Sha Money XL and John "J-Praize" Freeman, reached number 13 on the US Billboard Hot 100. The song originally appeared on 50 Cent's mixtape No Mercy, No Fear, released in August 2002.

Background
"Wanksta" was 50 Cent's first single to chart after signing up with Eminem's & Dr. Dre's labels, Shady Records & Aftermath Entertainment, as well as his first single since 1999's Thug Love. Originally appearing on his 2002 mixtape No Mercy, No Fear, it received a lot of airplay, and was eventually added to the 8 Mile soundtrack. It was a bonus track (track 17) on his 2003 commercial debut album Get Rich or Die Tryin'.

Eminem also made a remix, in 2003, aimed at Ja Rule and tweaked the beat to sound high pitched. The song appeared on the CD single box set The Singles.

The instrumental for the song was used for "Crackin", a song by The Psychopathic Rydas, in 2004. It was also used for "The Real Wanksta" by Black Child, in 2002, who is signed to The Inc. and was beefing with 50 because he was affiliated with Ja Rule.

R&B girl group Blaque recorded an answer song entitled "No Ganksta" in 2003.

50 cent opens the song with the lyrics "I got a lot of livin' to do before I die and I ain't got no time to waste...let's make it" which he took from the intro to Nina Simone's 1968 recording of "Do What You Gotta Do."

Etymology
The title is generally accepted as a portmanteau word meaning "self-obsessed, show-off person". The precise origin is debated, although most theories suggest a blend of "gangsta" and "wannabe".

50 Cent has explicitly stated that the word is not related to "wanker":

Jake Arnott: And another claim to fame: you introduced the word 'wanksta' into the language with your track 'Wanksta'. That word sort of means something in England — does it mean the same in America?

50 Cent: Nah, nah! 'Wanksta's like... we use that terminology to mean a fake gangster. When people told me about the word 'wanker'...

The song's lyrics were believed to be directed towards long time nemesis Ja Rule, but 50 Cent disputed this himself in a MuchMusic interview, stating that while the song itself was not directed at Ja, he was a good example of a wanksta.

Charts

Weekly charts

Year-end charts

Certifications

References

2002 songs
2002 singles
50 Cent songs
Songs written by 50 Cent
Music videos directed by Jessy Terrero
Shady Records singles
Aftermath Entertainment singles
Interscope Records singles
Diss tracks